Lāʻau lapaʻau is a traditional medical practice of Native Hawaiians. The Hawaiian words lāʻau and lapaʻau mean vegetation and treat, heal, or cure respectively. This practice involves using native plants, herbs and spirituality to treat ailments and injuries. Traditionally, lāʻau lapaʻau is practiced by Native Hawaiian healers known as Kahuna lāʻau lapaʻau.

History 
The history of lā‘au lapa‘au has been shared by past generations for over a thousand years. In the Native Hawaiian culture, it is believed that health is a result of pono or right living and that the loss of harmony and balance caused illness. Traditional Native Hawaiian medicinal practices are based on holistic healing in which the mind, body and spirit are intertwined.

When missionaries arrived in Hawai‘i in 1820, they believed that lā‘au lapa‘au was black magic, and moved for it to be outlawed. Though the practice was banned, kāhuna continued to practice in secret. In 1919, the Territorial Legislature created a Hawai‘i Medicine Board that was responsible for licensing lāʻau lapaʻau practitioners. However, in order to be licensed practitioners were required to use the Western names for plants instead of their Hawaiian names. Practitioners stopped being licensed when the Board was abolished in 1959. Lā‘au lapa‘au was recognized as a traditional medicine in the Native Hawaiian Health Care Act passed by the United States Congress in 1988.

Practice 
Kahuna lāʻau lapaʻau were known as the experts in lāʻau lapaʻau, comparable to general practitioners of today. In order to become a kāhuna lāʻau lapaʻau, one had to study for many decades and practice understanding the different healing properties of the laʻau. Kāhuna lāʻau lapaʻau is responsible for gathering, preparing and administering herbs based on the needs of the patient and the healing properties of the herbs / lāʻau.

Examples of the most common lāʻau used for healing include:

There are many parallels to lā‘au lapa‘au in other Polynesian cultures.

References 

Traditional healthcare occupations
Supernatural healing
Hawaii culture